The Philadelphia Wings were a member of the National Lacrosse League, a professional box lacrosse league in North America starting in 1987. They played at the Spectrum (1987–96) and then at the Wells Fargo Center in Philadelphia, Pennsylvania.

The Wings were one of the four original teams in the Eagle Pro Box Lacrosse League that began play in 1987 and the only team to reclaim its identity from the original 1974–75 National Lacrosse League and also retained the first Philadelphia Wings logo.

The Eagle Pro Box Lacrosse League was renamed the Major Indoor Lacrosse League in 1989, and again to the National Lacrosse League in 1998. They are the only franchise to have played all 24 seasons in the same city. The Wings have the most titles in the combined league history with six total: four North American Cups in the MILL era and two Champion's Cup since the formation of the NLL.

On July 11, 2014, it was announced on the team's website that the Wings would be relocating after 28 years in Philadelphia. On September 19, 2014, it was announced that the team will be known as the New England Black Wolves and will play at the Mohegan Sun Arena.

In September 2017 the National Lacrosse League announced that Comcast-Spectacor would be the owners of an expansion franchise for the 2018–19 season.  On November 29, 2017, it was announced the new franchise would use the "Wings" name.



History

Early years

The Philadelphia Wings were one of the original four franchises in the Eagle Pro Box Lacrosse League, joining the New Jersey Saints, Washington Wave, and Baltimore Thunder in the premiere season. While the Wings were not an immediate success on the floor, going 3–3 and 3–5 in the first two regular seasons with two playoff losses, they were the biggest draw in the league. They drew an average of almost 12,000 fans to their three 1987 regular season games, and slightly over 12,000 fans for their four games in 1988.

Their first on-field success came in 1989 with a first place 6–2 campaign, ending with their first of a league record 6 titles with an 11–10 win over New York at the Spectrum. The Wings became the first team to repeat with another 6–2 regular season followed by a championship win in Worcester over the New England Blazers. A 5–5 season in 1991 left the Wings in third place in the American Division, 1 game behind the division winners Baltimore and out of the playoffs for the first time in their history, denying them the opportunity for a "threepeat."

Some of the early stars of those teams included Mike French, Hall of Fame college player at Cornell and a current team executive; John Grant Sr., father of current NLL star John Grant Jr. and member of the Philadelphia Wings (1974–1975) ; Syracuse Hall of Famer Brad Kotz; long time Wings coach, Tony Resch; and long time NLL player and coach John Tucker.

Wings vs. Bandits
In 1992, the MILL expanded to Western New York with the Buffalo Bandits. The Bandits were primarily Canadian players from Ontario, while the Wings were still mostly American based, like the rest of the league at the time. The rivalry was instant, as the teams would play each other in 4 of the next 5 title games, interrupted only by the Wings triumph over Rochester in the 1995 season. The Wings struggled in the regular season of 1992, but turned it on in the playoffs to defeat Baltimore and New York and host the Bandits in the championship game.  John Tavares would end the Wings quest for their 3rd title with an overtime winner, however.

1993 saw the Wings have a 7–1 season, only to be topped by the Bandits perfect 8–0 season. Both teams dispatched their semifinal opponents, and the rematch was on. The Bandits once again ended the Wings hopes, this time winning a one-goal contest in regulation 13–12.

1994 saw both teams top their respective divisions with 6–2 marks, and again both teams dominated the semifinal game to meet for a 3rd consecutive time for the North American Cup. An incredible run by Philadelphia in the middle of the game buried the Bandits hopes of their own threepeat, giving the Wings a 26–15 win and their third title.

The Wings were their same dominating selves in 1995, going 7–1 to finish atop the single table (a structure the league changed back to before the season), while the Bandits uncharacteristically struggled, finishing just 4th in a 6 team league at 3–5. This meant the Wings faced the Bandits in the semifinals, and due to the MILL's "attendance rule" that gave postseason home field advantage to the team with better attendance, the game was played in Buffalo. The Wings proved to be the better team with a 19–16 win on their way to a league high 4th title.

1996 saw the Bandits return to their prior form, while both teams finishing 8–2 and tied atop the league standings. Once again, the teams found themselves in the final, and the Bandits returned the favor of stopping a threepeat with a dominating 15–10 performance.

1997 saw that Wings move from the Spectrum to the new CoreStates Center (now the Wells Fargo Center). It would also be the first time that the Wings and Bandits would not meet in the playoffs since the Bandits had been introduced in 1992. The Wings won another regular season title with a 7–1 record, but were upset in the semifinals by the eventual champion Rochester Knighthawks.

NLL era
The league name changed for 1998, but the Wings success did not. Despite the loss of Gary Gait to the Baltimore Thunder, the Wings still claimed their 4th regular season title in 5 years at 9–3. Once again, the Wings were paired up with their arch-rival Bandits in the semifinal round, and the Wings dispatched the Bandits just as they had in the previous semifinal matchup. The Wings advanced to play the Thunder and Gary Gait in the final round, which was a best 2 of 3 series for the one and only time in league history. The Wings opened the series with a 16–12 victory at home, before sweeping the series with a dominating 17–12 road victory in Baltimore Arena. Wings goaltender Dallas Eliuk was named Championship Series MVP.

1999 saw the end of the heated Wings-Bandits rivalry, as the Bandits started to rebuild and fell to a 4–8 mark, missing the postseason. The Wings also had regular season struggles, finishing at just 5–7 and squeaking into the playoffs as the fourth seed. Wings fans probably wish the team had missed the postseason, as the team was pummeled in a record breaking 13–2 loss to the eventual champion Toronto Rock. 2000 saw the team improve slightly to 7–5 during the season, but it ended the same way, with a semifinal loss in Toronto by a more respectable 14–10 score.

That set up the 2001 season, with the Wings once again seeing their league dominance challenged by a newcomer to the league. The Rock and the Wings did not disappoint, with the Rock going 11–3 and the Wings 10–4 in the regular season, and winning their semifinal games to set up a third straight postseason matchup in Toronto, this time with the title on the line. Unlike the previous two games, the Wings dictated the style of play, combined with the stellar goaltending of 2001 Championship Game MVP Dallas Eliuk, built a 9–4 lead, and never looked back. The Rock made a late-game rally but it proved too little, too late, and the Wings claimed their 6th title with a 9–8 upset victory, silencing the 19,409 Toronto Fans in attendance.

The 2002 season was clearly a transition year for the franchise, as they muddled through a difficult season to finish at 8–8 before falling in a quarterfinal game against the Washington Power. Until the 2008 season, it would prove to be the last playoff appearance for the proud franchise.

Rebuilding

The 2003 season saw the Wings start off strongly, but collapse down the stretch as they finished 8–8, and lost the division title to the Colorado Mammoth, missing the postseason for the first time since 1991. It would continue to get worse for the Wings, as the next two years ended with a last-place 7–9 2004 season and a 6–10 2005 season. The rebuilding of the Wings began in earnest in the offseason, with Perennial All-Pro Goaltender Dallas Eliuk being granted a trade request to be closer to home (due to his father's failing health), the Wings would have three first round draft picks before the 2006 season, adding Sean Greenhalgh, Luke Wiles, and Chad Thompson.  Wiles and Thompson were later dealt for Mike Regan, and Greenhalgh was moved to Buffalo after the 2007 season. Despite the added firepower, the Wings saw some improvement, going 8–8 in 2006 but missing the postseason on tiebreakers.

The 2006 draft was again fertile ground for the Wings, adding Geoff Snider, Ian Llord, and Athan Iannucci in the first round, and adding Kyle Wailes, another first round pick, through a trade with Calgary.  However, the 2007 season again would leave fans wondering about the future, when the Wings collapsed down the stretch with 4 losses in the last 5 games to crash to a 6–10 record and miss the playoffs for a fifth consecutive season. The entire coaching staff was fired after the season ended, though Lindsay Sanderson kept the role of GM.

Dave Huntley returns
On June 8, 2007, the Wings announced that the team's original general manager Dave Huntley would be their head coach for the 2008 season.  The personnel changes would continue as Sean Greenhalgh was moved to Buffalo and Ian Llord moved to Calgary in a deal that brought the Wings Jason Crosbie on offense and former Defenseman of the Year Taylor Wray on defense.  The Wings added goaltender Rob Blasdell in the dispersal draft that occurred for the one-year suspension of the Arizona Sting, and he was named the starting goaltender for the 2008 season. On March 5, 2008, the Wings continued to restructure the team, even when leading the league with a 6–1 record at the halfway point.  The Wings were involved in trades with the Chicago Shamrox, Minnesota Swarm, and Edmonton Rush leading to the acquisition of A.J. Shannon and Brandon Miller, while sending Matt Roik, Dan Marohl, Keith Cromwell, and Brad Self elsewhere.

All the changes paid off, as the Wings compiled a 10–6 record, good for a four-way tie for the Eastern Division championship.  Due to tiebreakers, they finished with the 4th seed in the East, and travelled to Buffalo for an Eastern Division semifinal game on May 2, 2008.  The Wings return to the postseason was short-lived, however, as the Wings dropped a 14–12 decision to the Bandits.

The 2008 season saw the emergence of two new Wings superstars, second year players Athan Iannucci and Geoff Snider. Iannucci scored 71 goals on the season, breaking Gary Gait's single-season scoring record of 61, and Snider set new records for loose balls (242), penalty minutes (103), and faceoffs won (318). Both made the All-Star team and All-Pro teams, and Iannucci was named Player of the Month three times as well as league MVP.

The 2009 season was marred by an offseason injury to star Athan Iannucci, who was only able to appear in 10 games, and compiled just 36 points after his record-breaking haul the season before.  Needing to re-establish an offense without the focal point, the Wings struggled to a 2–5 start, but were able to rally to win 4 of the next 6 and get back to a 7–8 record heading into the season finale in Rochester with a playoff spot on the line.  Back to back playoff berths were not to be, however, as the Wings fell to the Knighthawks 11–8 to finish the season 5th in the East.

2011 and beyond

In 2011, after 2 seasons with Dave Huntley as coach, the Wings appointed former Wings player John Tucker to the head coaching position. After winning two championships with the Wings while they were in the Major Indoor Lacrosse League in 1989 and 1990, Tucker had success in coaching the now defunct Baltimore Thunder and Pittsburgh Crossefire.

2011 started out well for Tucker and the Wings. After a slow start at home against Boston and Buffalo, Philadelphia ended January on a 3-game winning streak, taking two games from Colorado, and blowing out Boston on the road. Strong play from Max Seibald and goaltender Brandon Miller highlighted these wins, and put the Wings half a game out of first place. Shortly thereafter, the Wings season began to crumble. After an up and down February, which saw Philadelphia split with Buffalo, and lose in Rochester, the season bottomed out, with the Wings losing 7 out of their last 8 games, and finishing with a 5–11 record, 5 and a half games out of first place and tied with Dave Huntley in 2010 for the worst season record of all time. In June 2011, Tucker announced he was stepping down from the head coaching position to focus on his position as the Wings new director of United States collegiate scouting efforts.

On July 25, current Wings General Manager Johnny Mouradian became the team's new head coach. Mouradian had previously served as president, General Manager, and Advisor to the 2010 NLL Champs, the Washington Stealth. Mouradian wasted little time in shaping the 2012 season by trading Athan Iannucci to the Edmonton Rush with teammates Alex Turner and Brodie McDonald, along with Philadelphia's first round draft picks in 2012, 2013 and 2014. In exchange, the Wings acquired Edmonton transition player Brodie Merrill, Rush forwards Dean Hill, Mike McLellan, and Edmonton's 41st selection in the 2011 entry draft, and the 4th round selection in 2013.

Relocation

On July 11, 2014, the Philadelphia Wings announced through their home page that the franchise was looking to relocate for the 2015 season.  Citing the increasing saturation of the Philadelphia sports marketplace, “My love for the Wings and my connection with the city has made this move all the more difficult,” said Wings Owner and Team President Michael French.  “I would like to express my sincere gratitude to all of our Philadelphia supporters over the past 28 years.
 
“The financial model in a market with so many sport and entertainment alternatives has proven to be unsustainable,” added French.  “Finding a new venue with new strategic partners was the only way to ensure financial stability.” 

Despite being one of the oldest and most historic franchises in the league, attendance had begun to falter in the years before the Wings demise. Their attendance dropped 5% from 2011 to 2012 and then another 6% from 2012 to 2013. In February 2013 the Wings hosted a weekday game at 11 am, drawing the smallest attendance (5,139) in franchise history.

On August 4, 2014, it was reported that the Mohegan tribe would be purchasing an NLL team to play at the Mohegan Sun Arena in Uncasville, Connecticut. Two days later it was made official that French had sold half of the franchise to the Mohegans, and that the Wings would be relocating to Uncasville.  The franchise would be renamed the New England Black Wolves.

Resurrection

In September 2017 the National Lacrosse League announced that Comcast-Spectacor would be the owners of an expansion franchise for the 2018–19 season.  On November 29, 2017, it was announced the team would resume operations using the Wings name.

Awards and honors

NLL Hall of Fame members
 Scott Montgomery, Chris Fritz, Gary Gait, Paul Gait (Class of 2006)
 Mike French, Tom Marechek (Class of 2007)
 Tony Resch (Class of 2008)
 Dallas Eliuk (Class of 2009)
 Terry Sanderson (Class of 2015)
 Kevin Finneran (Class of 2021)

NLL records held
 Single Season Goal Scoring Record - Athan Iannucci (71 goals, 2008)
 Single Season Loose Balls Record - Geoff Snider (244 LB, 2008)
 Single Season Faceoff Wins Record - Peter Jacobs (318 FW, 2005) and Geoff Snider (318 FW, 2008)
 Single Season PIM Record - Geoff Snider (103 PIM, 2008)
 Most Goals in a Single Game - Paul Gait (10 goals, 26 March 1994)

Fan support and traditions
Philadelphia fans were known for their passionate support of their team, and the less-than-hospitable treatment of opposing players. In a poll of the players, over 62% stated that Wings fans had screamed the filthiest and nastiest things at them in the league.

Of the fans, goaltender Rob Blasdell said "They truly are the best fans in the league. They're probably the most knowledgeable fans in the league. It would kind of be the same as playing for the Leafs in Toronto. They're very, very passionate."  Philadelphia fans enjoy the physical aspect of the game, leading Geoff Snider to comment: "The Philly fans are great. They are very loyal and they get behind it. I got a standing ovation once for a roughing penalty. I'd never seen anything like that before."

Fans traditions started from the national anthem, when fans could be heard making a 'tsch' sound at the end of each line, mocking a recording that was used by the Wings in the early years where the only audible portion of the song was the cymbal crashes. During the introductions of the opposing team, each player's name was followed by a call of "sucks", a tradition that has been extended to the opposing coaches, trainers, and the game officials. The local shot clock operator had escaped the jeering, and was instead cheered.

During the game, the opposing goalie was often the target of fans' heckling. The most common chant was to remind the goalies "It's all your fault" after every goal they allow.

One of the more notable traditions was the dueling "W-I-N-G-S" cheers. The side of the arena with the penalty boxes had long been led by "Chopper", a Wings superfan with face paint and a hard hat, well known around the league making opposing players who find their way to the penalty box regret their time there. The bench side went through many leaders, from "Big Gabe" and the little gabesters (consisting of Matt Denker, Joshua Gross, Jordan Elsas, Adam David and Eli Goldstein) (father of Scott Gabrielson, a Wings captain in the 1990s) to "Big E" to Chasmo, and now "The Captain" and "Morpheus" or as he made himself known as during the second half of the game on February 29, 2008, "Doctor Lacrosse". The "kick butt baby" (Eric Kulb Martinez) was the biggest little fan even though he could barely talk. While the leader of the chants aren't always the same from year to year, the "W-I-N-G-S WINGS!" cheer did not die out at all, and is still present following the team's revival.

Roster

All time record

Playoff results

Head coaching history

Notes and references

See also

Philadelphia Wings seasons
1974-75 Philadelphia Wings team
Lacrosse in Pennsylvania

External links
Wingzone Web Site
Wings All Access on NLL Radio

Sports in Philadelphia
Lacrosse clubs established in 1987
Lacrosse teams in Pennsylvania
Major Indoor Lacrosse League teams
Defunct National Lacrosse League teams
1987 establishments in Pennsylvania
Sports clubs disestablished in 2014
2014 disestablishments in Pennsylvania